Patrick Macias (born 1972 in Sacramento, California) is an American author and co-author of several titles on pop culture fandom, specifically relating to Japanese culture and  culture in America. Macias is also a correspondent for NHK World Television show Tokyo Eye, and is the editor-in-chief of the  culture magazine Otaku USA, which debuted on June 5, 2007.
In 2014, Patrick became the Senior Manager of New Initiatives at Crunchyroll.

Biography
Macias became a published writer when he was 19, writing about youth culture for zines and other publications. Alvin Lu, a former editor of the San Francisco Bay Guardian, asked Macias to write for the Guardian based on Macias's early work, and this led to a regular column titled "Tiger on Beat" in which Macias covered Hong Kong movies. Lu went on to edit Tokyoscope and Pulp, and Macias likewise began writing for Pulp and became the assistant editor for Animerica.

In 2010, Patrick was contracted to become the co-host of the webshow, Otaku-Verse-Zero, sponsored by Japanese internet radio station company known as K'z Station. With his co-host Yuu Asakawa, he would explore anime and other Japanese sub-culture in and round Tokyo. In 2011, Patrick would join Crunchyroll's web-talk show The Live Show as co-host for the show.

In 2014, Patrick began writing the PARANOIA GIRLS webcomic, “an experimental science fiction story set in the Northern California suburbs of 1985,” featuring art by Japanese surrealist Yunico Uchiyama.

In 2015, Patrick created the HYPERSONIC music club webcomic for Crunchyroll, featuring art by illustrator Hiroyuki Takahashi, in which cyborg DJs battle demons from another dimension.

Later in 2015, Patrick began working with artist Mugi Tanaka on the PARK Harajuku: Crisis Team! webcomic, conceived as a collaboration between Crunchyroll and the " fashion" PARK store in Harajuku, Tokyo. This webcomic was adapted into the 2017 anime series Urahara.

Bibliography
(1999) Fresh Pulp: Dispatches from the Japanese Pop Culture Front (1997-1999)
(1999) Japan Edge: The Insider's Guide to Japanese Pop Subculture
(2001) TokyoScope: The Japanese Cult Film Companion
(2003) Anime Poster Art: Japan's Movie House Masterpieces
(2004) Cruising The Anime City: An Otaku Guide To Neo Tokyo
(2006) Otaku in USA – Love & Misunderstanding! The History of Adopted Anime in America!
(2007) Japanese Schoolgirl Inferno: Tokyo Teen Fashion Subculture Handbook
(2007–2014) Otaku USA Magazine

References

External links
 
 Profile at Crunchyroll
 Interview with Patrick Macias and Izumi Evers at About.com

1972 births
Living people
American male journalists
Journalists from California
Writers from Sacramento, California
Anime and manga critics